Huai Yai Chiu railway station is a railway station located in Huai Yai Chiu Subdistrict, Thep Sathit District, Chaiyaphum Province.

References 

Railway stations in Thailand
Chaiyaphum province